The Circle of Liberal Reformers (CLR) is a political party in Gabon.

History
The CLR was formed in 1993 as a breakaway from the ruling Gabonese Democratic Party (PDG), and was led by Jean-Boniface Assélé. It supported incumbent President Omar Bongo of the PDG in the 1993 presidential elections.

The party won two seats in the 1996 parliamentary elections, and retained both in the 2001 elections. It was part of the PDG-led bloc in the 2006 elections, again retaining both seats. It was reduced to one seat in the 2011 elections.

References

Political parties in Gabon
1991 establishments in Gabon
Political parties established in 1991
Liberal parties in Africa